Jean Nachand (born June 6, 1955) is an American former professional tennis player.

Nachand grew up in Los Angeles County, attending Palos Verdes High School. She played collegiate tennis for UC Irvine and along with Lindsay Morse was their first female All-American. In 1977 she represented the United States at the Summer Universiade in Sofia, Bulgaria On the professional tour she teamed up to Morse to win a WTA Tour doubles title in Nagoya in 1980. She has since held various executive roles for the USTA and WTA.

WTA Tour finals

Doubles (1–0)

References

External links
 

1955 births
Living people
American female tennis players
American sports executives and administrators
UC Irvine Anteaters athletes
College women's tennis players in the United States
Sportspeople from Los Angeles County, California
Competitors at the 1977 Summer Universiade
Tennis people from California